Hakea amplexicaulis, commonly known as prickly hakea, is a shrub endemic to south west Western Australia. An attractive small shrub with unusual stem clasping, sharply serrated foliage and a profusion of sweetly scented variable coloured flowers from late winter to spring.

Description
The inflorescence has 36-42 large, rounded and strongly scented flowers on a short stem. Clusters of white, cream, pink or red flowers appear in leaf axils; they may become pink or a reddish hue as they age. Flowering occurs from August to November.

Taxonomy and naming
The species was first formally described  in 1810 by Robert Brown and the description was published in Transactions of the Linnean Society of London. The specific epithet (amplexicaulis) is derived from the Latin words  amplexus meaning "encircled" or "embraced" and caulis meaning "stem", referring to the stem-clasping habit at the base of the leaf.

Distribution and habitat
Hakea amplexicaulis is found in jarrah forests from Perth to Albany. This species grows in clay, loam and gravelly acidic soils in a well-drained site in sun or partial shade.  A showy shrub,  good for wildlife habitat and is moderately frost hardy.

Conservation status
Hakea amplexicaulis is classified as "not threatened" by  Western Australian government Department of Parks and Wildlife.

Gallery

References

amplexicaulis
Eudicots of Western Australia
Plants described in 1810